Sarah Elizabeth Rainsford is a BBC foreign correspondent who has reported from Russia, Ukraine, Spain, Turkey, Cuba, Afghanistan and Iraq while working for the BBC since 1999.

Early life and education
Rainsford attended secondary school in the  Midlands and then graduated with a degree in languages, specializing in Russian and French, from Fitzwilliam College, Cambridge. As part of her studies, she spent a year abroad in Saint Petersburg.

Expulsion from Russia

Rainsford was informed by the Russian government in mid-August 2021 that her visa would not be renewed, in effect expelling her as part of retaliatory actions between the United Kingdom and Russia over news coverage.

Tim Davie, the Director-General of the BBC, stated that "the expulsion of Sarah Rainsford is a direct assault on media freedom which we condemn unreservedly. Sarah is an exceptional and fearless journalist. She is a fluent Russian speaker who provides independent and in-depth reporting of Russia and the former Soviet Union.... We urge the Russian authorities to reconsider their decision. In the meantime, we will continue to report events in the region independently and impartially."

References

External links

BBC podcast, The price of dissent in Belarus, 9 Aug 2021, 1:25-6;22

Alumni of Fitzwilliam College, Cambridge
Living people
British journalists
Writers about Russia
BBC newsreaders and journalists
Year of birth missing (living people)